Connick v. Thompson, 563 U.S. 51 (2011), is a United States Supreme Court case in which the Court considered whether a prosecutor's office can be held liable for a single Brady violation by one of its members on the theory that the office provided inadequate training.

Background

In 1984, John Thompson, a 22-year-old African American father of two, was charged along with another man for killing a prominent New Orleans businessman. After his picture was published in the newspaper because of the arrest, victims of an unsolved attempted armed robbery identified Thompson as the person involved.

Handling both cases, the district attorney of the Parish of Orleans, Harry Connick Sr., chose to first bring to trial the armed robbery charge against Thompson in hopes that a conviction would help with the murder case. Based solely on the identification by the three victims, Thompson was found guilty of attempted armed robbery and sentenced to 50 years in prison. Then during the murder trial, Thompson was effectively precluded from testifying in his own defense because the prosecution would have impeached his testimony by referring to his armed robbery conviction. His codefendant was able to testify that he saw Thompson commit the murder without rebuttal testimony from Thompson. Thompson was convicted of the murder and sentenced to death. However, Connick suppressed a critical blood sample test. Elisa Abolafia, a private investigator, discovered that the blood splatter on the victim from the robbery did not match the blood type of Thompson. This meant that Thompson was wrongfully convicted of the robbery; a conviction that prohibited him from defending himself vigorously in the murder case. Connick also suppressed evidence in the murder trial, failing to disclose to Thompson's legal team the existence of an eyewitness description that matched one of the prosecution's witnesses, Kevin Freeman, and audio of witness Richard Perkins which implied Perkins had come forward for a cash reward and had used Freeman as his source. Thompson's murder case was vacated in 2002 and he was retried with his defense providing evidence that Freeman had committed the murder.

After nearly two decades of wrongfully being imprisoned, Thompson was found not guilty in the retrial. Thompson eventually sued Connick and several of his assistant district attorneys for suppression of evidence and won a verdict of $14 million.

Opinion of the court

On March 29, 2011, the United States Supreme Court, in a 5–4 decision written by Justice Clarence Thomas, overturned the $14 million award by the lower court, with the decision split along ideological lines. The majority found for the appellant, Harry Connick Sr., holding that the prosecutor's office is not liable under §1983, saying that "the only issue before [the Court] is whether Connick, as the policy maker for the district attorney's office, was deliberately indifferent to the need to train the attorneys under his authority" to which Justice Thomas said the answer to that question was no, given an absence of proof concerning a pattern of misconduct.

The dissent, written by Justice Ruth Bader Ginsburg, observed that Thompson was the victim of much more pervasive misconduct by the District Attorney's office than a single Brady violation.

Criticism

The New York Times opined that "Justice Ginsburg's dissent is the more persuasive...", and the Los Angeles Times wrote that "[t]he court got this one wrong." Nina Totenberg wrote that "a bitterly divided U.S. Supreme Court all but closed the door" to prosecutors being held liable for damages when prosecutors violate the law to deprive a person of a fair trial. Dahlia Lithwick wrote "Both Thomas and Scalia have produced what can only be described as a master class in human apathy. Their disregard for the facts of Thompson's thrashed life and near-death emerges as a moral flat line...only by willfully ignoring that entire trial record can [Scalia] and Thomas reduce the entire constitutional question to a single misdeed by a single bad actor." Radley Balko noted that "...[t]here's something pretty unsavory about a judicial philosophy that cites a ruling that we now know sent an innocent man back to prison as an authority to deny compensation to another innocent man who was nearly executed because the government hid the evidence that would have and eventually did exonerate him." Kieran Healy called the tone of the majority opinion "spiteful", and the decision a "Lord Denning Moment" for the court. Healy continued, "[t]he conservative majority preferred to affirm an obvious wrong rather than face the appalling vista of a brutal and corrupt justice system." Andrew Cohen called the majority's argument a "warped rationale." Wendy Kaminer wrote that "...what's striking about this case, aside from the majority's apparent indifference to practical realities and the actual sufferings of an innocent man wrongfully sentenced to die, is its indifference to the facts of the case outlined by Justice Ginsburg's dissent." Bennett Gershman and Joel Cohen called the majority's reasoning "bizarre," and wrote that "[Ginsburg's] dissent was so contemptuous of the majority's decision that it provoked a gratuitous concurring opinion from Justice Scalia in a likely effort to seek to legitimize the majority opinion from her savage rebuke." Writing for the American Constitution Society, Brandon Garrett called the ruling "chilling" and the majority's arguments "formalistic and circular."

See also
 Harry Connick Sr.
 Shareef Cousin
 List of United States Supreme Court cases, volume 563

References

Further reading

External links
 

2011 in United States case law
Brady material case law
Second Enforcement Act of 1871 case law
United States Supreme Court cases
United States Supreme Court cases of the Roberts Court